Edmund James Whalen (born July 6, 1958) is an American prelate of the Roman Catholic Church who has been serving as an auxiliary bishop for the Archdiocese of New York since 2019.

Biography

Early life 
Edmund Whalen was born July 6, 1958, in Staten Island, New York. He attended Blessed Sacrament Church and School in Staten Island and Monsignor Farrell High School in Staten Island.  He then entered Cathedral College of the Immaculate Conception in Queens, New York, and later attended the Pontifical Gregorian University and the Alphonsian Academy, both in Rome.

Priesthood 
On June 23, 1984, Whalen was ordained to the priesthood by Cardinal John O'Connor for the Archdiocese of New York. He has served the archdiocese as: 

 Parochial vicar for Resurrection Parish in Rye, New York
 Priest-secretary to Cardinal O'Connor 
 Faculty/leadership at Monsignor Farrell High School, St. Joseph Seminary in Yonkers, New York and St. John Neumann Seminary Residence in the Bronx
 Pastor of St. Benedict's Parish in the Bronx and St. Joseph–St. Thomas Parish in Staten Island
 Archdiocesan vicar for clergy

Auxiliary Bishop of New York 
Pope Francis appointed Whalen as an auxiliary bishop  for the Archdiocese of New York on October 10, 2019. He was consecrated by Cardinal Timothy Dolan on December 10, 2019.

See also
 

 Hierarchy of the Catholic Church
 Catholic Church in the United States
 Historical list of the Catholic bishops of the United States
 List of Catholic bishops of the United States
 Lists of patriarchs, archbishops, and bishops

References

External links

1958 births
Living people
People from Staten Island
21st-century American Roman Catholic titular bishops
People of the Roman Catholic Archdiocese of New York
Roman Catholic bishops in New York (state)
Bishops appointed by Pope Francis